Ambra Senatore (born 1976) is an Italian choreographer, researcher and educator at the University of Milan. In 2015, she was named director of the Centre Chorégraphique National de Nantes.

She was born in Turin. In 2004, she completed a doctorate in contemporary dance. She has trained with various choreographers including Carolyn Carlson, Dominique Dupuy and Bill T. Jones. In 2012, she established a dance company EDA based in Besançon. She lectures on the history of dance at the University of Milan. In 2007, she published La danza d’autore, vent’anni di danza contemporanea in Italia.

In 2018, she developed choreography for dances performed in the opera Cendrillon by Jules Massenet.

Choreographed works 
 Merce 
 Passo (2010), was awarded the Premio Equilibrio by the Fondazione Musica per Roma
 A Posto (2011)
 John (2012)
 Aringa Rossa (2014)
 Quante Storie (2016)

References 

1976 births
Living people
Academic staff of the University of Milan
Italian choreographers